Adjutant Jacques Gérard (1890-1918) was a French World War I flying ace. He was credited with eight confirmed aerial victories before dying while battling to liberate his homeland.

Early life
Jacques Gérard was born in Paris, France, on 26 October 1890. He joined the 113e Regiment d'Infanterie to defend his country during World War I.

World War I

Once he had joined the infantry, he found himself assigned as a mechanic and driver. This work brought him in contact with the truck-borne laboratories used for developing aerial photography. An assignment to Escadrille C18 of the Aéronautique Militaire followed. He subsequently entered pilot's training, and was licensed with his brevet in August 1917. He then rounded off his aviation education with advanced training at Pau and Cazaux. Upon completion of training, he was assigned to Escadrille N65 as a pilot on 10 November 1917. By this time, he had risen to corporal.

He was promoted to sergeant on 25 January 1918, and scored his first aerial victory on 30 January while flying a Spad VII. His victory tally mounted until he became an ace on 23 April, when he downed a brace of German reconnaissance planes. This action brought him the award of the Médaille militaire. The accompanying citation read (in English translation):

On 25 June 1918, the date of his seventh confirmed victory, he was promoted to Adjutant. He would score one more confirmed victory. Then, on 3 July 1918, he was killed in action while battling five German airplanes.

List of aerial victories
See also Aerial victory standards of World War I

Numbered victories in following table denote confirmed victories in chronological order. The notation "u/c" marks unconfirmed claims.

References
 Over the Front: A Complete Record of the Fighter Aces and Units of the United States and French Air Services, 1914-1918 Norman L. R. Franks, Frank W. Bailey. Grub Street, 1992. , 9780948817540.
 Spad VII Aces of World War I: Volume 39 of Aircraft of the Aces. Jon Guttman. Osprey Publishing, 2001. , 9781841762227.

Endnotes

French World War I flying aces
1890 births
1918 deaths
French military personnel killed in World War I